Slack voice (or lax voice) is the pronunciation of consonant or vowels with a glottal opening slightly wider than that occurring in modal voice. Such sounds are often referred to informally as lenis or half-voiced in the case of consonants. In Xhosa, slack-voiced consonants have usually been transcribed as breathy voice. Although the IPA has no dedicated diacritic for slack voice, the voiceless diacritic (the under-ring) may be used with a voiced consonant letter, though this convention is also used for partially voiced consonants in languages such as English.

Wu Chinese "muddy" consonants are slack voice word-initially, the primary effect of which is a slightly breathy quality of the following vowel.

Javanese contrasts slack and stiff voiced bilabial, dental, retroflex, and velar stops.

Parauk contrasts slack voicing in its vowels. The contrast is between "slightly stiff" and "slightly breathy" vowels; the first are between modal and stiff voice, while the latter are captured by slack voice.

References

Phonation